José David Domínguez Guimera (born December 29, 1980 in Cádiz) is a Spanish race walker.

He finished ninth in the 20 km race at the 2003 World Championships in a personal best time of 1:20:15 hours, and eighteenth at the 2004 IAAF World Race Walking Cup.

Achievements

References

Spanish Olympic Committee

1980 births
Living people
Spanish male racewalkers
Athletes (track and field) at the 2000 Summer Olympics
Athletes (track and field) at the 2004 Summer Olympics
Olympic athletes of Spain
Competitors at the 2001 Summer Universiade
Sportspeople from Cádiz
20th-century Spanish people
21st-century Spanish people